Mathurin Anghiley (3 June 1886 in Libreville, Gabon - 1 June 1949 in Libreville) was a Gabonese politician who was elected to the French Senate in 1947. His daughter was the trade unionist Simone Saint-Dénis.

References 

Gabonese politicians
French Senators of the Fourth Republic
1886 births
1949 deaths
Senators of French Equatorial Africa